Eunapiodes is a genus of grasshoppers in the family Pamphagidae. There are at least four described species in Eunapiodes, found in North Africa.

Species
These four species belong to the genus Eunapiodes:
 Eunapiodes atlantis (Chopard, 1943)
 Eunapiodes granosus (Stål, 1876)
 Eunapiodes ifranensis (Werner, 1932)
 Eunapiodes latipes Bolívar, 1912

References

Pamphagidae